Galvarino is a Chilean town and commune, part of Cautín Province, in the Araucanía Region.

Its population come eminently from original Mapuche indigenous people. The area was colonized fundamentally by Swiss colonizers. The main economic activity is forestal activity, shown as great amount of the territory dedicated to production of forestal trees, like eucalyptus and pines.

Demographics
Of these, 3,539 (28.1%) lived in urban areas and 9,057 (71.9%) in rural areas. The population fell by 10.5% (1480 persons) between the 1992 and 2002 censuses.

Administration
As a commune, Galvarino is a third-level administrative division of Chile administered by a municipal council, headed by an alcalde who is directly elected every four years. The 2016-2020 alcalde is Marcos Hernandez Rojas (PDC).

Within the electoral divisions of Chile, Galvarino is represented in the Chamber of Deputies by Diego Paulsen (RN) and Fuad Chahín (PDC) as part of the 49th electoral district, together with Victoria, Curacautín, Lonquimay, Melipeuco, Vilcún, Lautaro and Perquenco. The commune is represented in the Senate by Alberto Espina Otero (RN) and Jaime Quintana Leal (PPD) as part of the 14th senatorial constituency (Araucanía-North).

References

External links
  Municipality of Galvarino

Communes of Chile
Populated places in Cautín Province
1882 establishments in Chile